Onnaing is a commune in the Nord department in northern France.
Onnaing is home to Toyota Motor Manufacturing France, where the Toyota Yaris and Yaris Cross are assembled.

Population

Heraldry

See also
Communes of the Nord department

References

Communes of Nord (French department)